Michael L. "Mike" Cohen (born July 19, 1949) was a Democratic member of the New York State Assembly, representing the 28th Assembly District in Queens County, New York.

A former New York City Transit worker, Cohen was involved in with the transit unions and was elected to the local community board. In 1999 he began his first term in the State Assembly. He resigned from the Assembly effective March 14, 2005. The seat was filled in a special election won by Andrew Hevesi, the son of former New York State Comptroller Alan Hevesi.

In April 2009, then New York State Attorney General Andrew Cuomo charged New York Liberal Party leader Raymond Harding with accepting more than $800,000 in exchange for political favors for Alan Hevesi. Harding was also accused of helping arrange a $150,000-a-year position for Cohen with the Health Insurance Plan of New York (HIP), in order to clear the Assembly seat for a run by Hevesi's son. Neither Cohen nor Hevesi were charged with any wrongdoing.

Cohen ran for New York City Council in 2009, seeking to represent City Council District 29 which includes the Queens neighborhoods of Forest Hills, Rego Park, and Kew Gardens. He lost the September 2009 Democratic primary election to Karen Koslowitz, who went on to win the November 2009 general election.

Election results

State Assembly
 November 1998 general election, NYS Assembly, 28th AD
{| class="Wikitable"
| Michael Cohen (DEM) || ... || 15,970
|-
| Matthew D. Hunter (REP – CON – IND – LIB) || ... || 8,266
|}

 November 2000 general election, NYS Assembly, 28th AD
{| class="Wikitable"
| Michael Cohen (DEM – IND – LIB) || ... || 24,670
|-
| Michael Roemmelt (REP – CON) || ... || 9,271
|}

 November 2002 general election, NYS Assembly, 28th AD
{| class="Wikitable"
| Michael Cohen (DEM – LIB – WOR) || ... || 12,892
|-
| Todd C. Bank (REP – CON) || ... || 6,641
|}

 November 2004 general election, NYS Assembly, 28th AD
{| class="Wikitable"
| Michael L. Cohen (DEM – IND) || ... || 23,674
|-
| Michael D. Weiss (REP) || ... || 10,173
|}

City Council, Democratic primary
 September 2009 Democratic primary election, City Council, 29th District
{| class="Wikitable"
| Karen Koslowitz || ... || 1,937
|-
| Lynn C. Schulman || ... || 1,647
|-
| Heidi Harrison Chain || ... || 1,442
|-
| Michael Cohen || ... || 983
|-
| Albert Cohen || ... || 950
|-
| Melquiades Gagarin || ... || 464
|}

References

Living people
Democratic Party members of the New York State Assembly
People from Queens, New York
1949 births